Hrašče is a village west of Postojna in the Inner Carniola region of Slovenia.

Name
Hrašče was attested in written sources in 1498 as Krasschach, with a locative ending. The name Hrašče, like similar names (e.g., Hraše, Hrastje, Hrastovica, Hrastnik), is derived from the plural demonym *Hrasťane, in turn derived from the word hrast 'oak', and originally referred to the local vegetation.

Church

The local church in the settlement is dedicated to Saint Anne and belongs to the Parish of Hrenovice.

References

External links

Hrašče on Geopedia

Populated places in the Municipality of Postojna